The Underground Man (1997) is a novel by Mick Jackson. Critically acclaimed, it was shortlisted for the Booker Prize for that year. It shows the life of an eccentric and reclusive Victorian Duke, loosely modelled on William Cavendish-Scott-Bentinck, 5th Duke of Portland. His latest scheme involves building a set of tunnels beneath his estate.

In 2016 it was adapted for the stage by Nick Wood for Nottingham Playhouse.

References

External links 
 Official webpage
 Fantastic Fiction
 Interview on bookmunch
 Review on The Edge
 Review Summary on All Readers

1997 British novels
Picador (imprint) books